The Sabarimala Sree Dharma Sastha Temple is a temple complex located on Sabarimala hill inside the Periyar Tiger Reserve, Ranni-Perunad Village, Ranni Taluk,Pathanamthitta district, Kerala, India. It is one of the largest annual pilgrimage sites in the world, with an estimate of over 10 to 15 million devotees visiting every year. The temple is dedicated to a Hindu Brahmachari (celibate) deity named Ayyappan also known as Dharma Shasta, who, according to one belief, is the son of Shiva and Vishnu. Sabarimala Temple exemplifies the convergence of diverse religions in India.

This Ayyappan Temple is situated on a hilltop amidst eighteen hills at an altitude of 487 m (1598 ft) above the mean sea level and is surrounded by mountains and dense forests. The dense forest, part of the Periyar Tiger Reserve, around the temple is known as Poongavanam. Temples exist in each of the hills surrounding Sabarimala. While functional and intact temples exist at many places in the surrounding areas like Nilakkal, Kalaketty, and Karimala, remnants of old temples survive to this day on the remaining hills.

In response to a PIL filed in 1991, the Kerala High Court had judged that the restriction of entry of women ages 10–50 to the temple was in accordance with the usage prevalent from time immemorial, and it directed the Devaswom Board to uphold the customary traditions of the temple and also concluded that "there is no restriction between one section and another section or between one class and another class among the Hindus in the matter of entry to a temple (Sabarimala), whereas the prohibition is only in respect of women of a particular age group and not women as a class." However, On 28 September 2018, the Supreme Court of India, in a 4-1 majority decision (4 men and 1 woman judicial panel), overturned the ban on the entry of women. But the lone woman judge, Indu Malhotra noted in her dissenting judgement that "what constitutes an essential religious practice is for the religious community to decide" and not a matter that should be decided by the courts. She also added that "notions of rationality cannot be invoked in matters of religion by courts." The Chief Justice, Dipak Misra, stated that the selective ban on women was not an "essential part" of Hinduism but instead a form of "religious patriarchy." Justice Dhananjaya Y. Chandrachud stated that the ban "stigamatises" and "stereotypes" women while "placing the burden of men's celibacy" on them. After the Supreme Court's decision, there were large protests and rallies in the southern state of Kerala. Devotees have filed around 65 review petitions against 28 September 2018 verdict. 

The Supreme Court of India even accepted a review petition against its own order. But because of the facts and circumstances, the Supreme Court has decided to accept the review petition and hold the hearing in public. After completion of the hearing in February 2019, the Court ordered, under the new Chief Justice, Mr. Ranjan Gagoi, to refer the matter to a big bench comprising seven judges to re-consider the decision of 28 September 2018.

The temple is open for worship only during the days of Mandalapooja (approximately 15 November to 26 December), Makaravilakku or "Makara Sankranti" (14 January), and Maha Thirumal Sankranti (14 April), and the first five days of each Malayalam month. The pilgrimage includes a unique tradition of offering prayer at the mosque of Vavar, a Muslim devotee of Ayappan.

Origins and Legends 

According to the Bhagavatam, Shiva fell in love with Vishnu while he was in Mohini form. Their connection resulted in the conception of Shasta. As the other name for Shiva is Har and that of Vishnu is Hari, the child born was also known as Hariharputra. It is believed that Ayyappa is an avatar of Shasta.

The worship of Shasta forms part of the ancient history of south India. There are many Shasta temples in South India and across the globe. 

Five Shasta temples are said to be linked to Parasurama, an incarnation of Lord Vishnu. Sastha temples in Kulathupuzha, Aryankavu, Achankovil, Sabarimala, and Ponnambalmedu are among the five Shasta temples.

Folklore says that the temple in Kulathupuzha is related to the Lord's childhood years, where he was enshrined as a child. The Aryankavu temple is related to the Lord's adolescence, the Brahmachari state. The Achankovil temple is connected to the Lord's Grahastha years, where he is shown sitting on a horse and holding a sword, along with his wives, Pushkala and Poorna. The Sabarimala temple is associated with the Lord's Vanaprastha years, and in the Ponnambalmedu or Kantamala temple, the Lord is shown as the greatest Yogi.

Legend of Manikanthan 
Sage Suta told his followers the story of how Ayyappa was born, according to Bhutnathopakhyanam, which is the most important book for Ayyappan followers. After Chamundi killed Mahisasura, his sister Mahisi arrived to take revenge on the devas (gods). Mahisi was invincible because Lord Brahma gave her a boon. Only a human incarnation born of two males could kill her.

The devas were afraid and helpless, so they sought assistance from Lord Vishnu. The union of Lord Shiva and Vishnu, who took the avatar of Mohini, produced a son named Manikanthan.

Manikanthan, was abandoned on the banks of the Pampa River in southern India. The emperor Rajasekhara of the Panthalam dynasty, who didn't have any children, found this child. In the meantime, the queen delivered a baby. The queen disliked Manikanthan and devised a scheme to eliminate him. She lied about her sickness, claiming that she could only be treated by consuming tiger's milk. Twelve-year-old Manikanthan ventured into the wilderness in search of tiger's milk for her mother. On his journey through the forest, he destroyed Mahisi. The devas were pleased at Mahishi's death. Indra assumed the appearance of a tiger, which Manikanthan used to return to the kingdom. He flung an arrow into the forest to mark the location of a temple, directed them to construct a temple, and then departed for Devloka (the devas' abode).

The shrine of Sabarimala is an ancient temple. It is believed that the prince of the Pandalam dynasty, an avatar of Shasta, meditated at Sabarimala temple and became one with the divine. The place where the prince meditated is the Manimandapam.

In 1821, the kingdom of Pandalam was added to Travancore. 48 major temples, including the Sabarimala temple, were also added to Travancore.

The origins of Shabrimala start with the Ramayana. Shabari was a woman from a village. According to Krishna Dutt, she was a seeker of knowledge and wanted to know the meaning of Dharma. After days of travel, she met Sage Matanga at the foot of Mount Rishyamukha. She accepted him as her guru, serving him with devotion for many years. When Matanga was about to die, Shabari, now elderly, stated that after serving him throughout her life, she now sought to reach for herself the same "abode of peace" that Matanga had reached. The sage responded that, if she offered seva (service), Bhagawan Rama would give her darshana. He told her to await Rama's arrival. Then, while sitting in lotus posture, the sage attained Mahasamadhi. Following her guru's advice, Shabari awaited Rama's arrival.

Every day, Shabari would go out of her ashram, with the help of a walking stick, and pluck berries for Rama. She would pluck one, taste it, and, if it was sweet, she would put it in her basket, discarding the bitter ones. She wanted to give the good berries to Rama. She didn't know that offerings must not be tasted. So, after picking a few berries, Shabari would go back to the ashram and wait eagerly for Rama to come.

Rama's Arrival 
According to the scriptural account, even though hundreds of other yogis were waiting to receive Rama in their ashrams, Rama went only to Shabari's ashram because of her sincere devotion. On seeing Rama, Shabari became ecstatic and said, "There were so many exalted yogis waiting for your darshan, but you came to this unworthy devotee." This clearly shows that you will neither see whether a devotee lives in a palace or a humble hut, whether he is erudite or ignorant, nor see caste nor color. You will only see the true Bhakti. I do not have anything to offer other than my heart, but here are some berries. "May it please you, my Lord." Shabari offered the fruits that she had meticulously collected. As Rama tasted them, Lakshmana raised the concern that Shabari had already tasted them and that they were, therefore, unworthy of eating. To this, Rama responded that, of the many types of food he had tasted, "nothing could equal these berries, offered with such devotion." You must taste them before you will know. Whomsoever offers a fruit, leaf, flower, or some water with love, I partake in it with great joy." Traditional writers use this narrative to indicate that in bhakti, faults are not seen by the deities.

Pleased with Shabari's devotion, Rama blesses her with his vision. Rama notices the donas, or bowls, of handmade leaves in which she had offered the fruits and is impressed by the hard work Shabari has gone through to make them and, hence, blesses the tree so that the leaves naturally grow in the shape of a bowl. Lord Ram also said that the entire mountain would be known in her name as Shabari mala (Mala in malayalam means mountain. So literal translation means Shabari's mountain) and also said that in Kaliyuga, a son born from Lord Shiva and Lady Mohini, will come there too and will get concretised. He will be known as Dharma Shasta and will guide the estranged people.

Shabari also tells Rama to take help from Sugriva and where to find him. The Ramayana says that Shabari was a very bright and knowledgeable saint. The ashram in which Shabari stayed and waited for Lord Rama was called as Shabari Narayan which was situated in today's Shivrinaryan. A town located in Janjgir-Champa district in Chhattisgarh.

The temple 

The Sannidhanam (main temple) is built on a plateau about 40 feet high.

The temple was rebuilt after arson and vandalism in 1950. No charges were brought and the earlier stone image of the deity was replaced by a panchaloha (an alloy from five metals) idol, about 1 and half feet. The Panchaloha idol was crafted by Neelakanta Panicker and his younger brother Ayyappa Panicker, residents of Thattavila Vishwakarma family, Chengannur, Kerala, to replace the original stone figure of the deity. Edavankadan T.N. Padmanabhan Achari from Mavaelikkara was appointed the supervisor in charge of new idol by Maharaja Sree Chithira Tirunaal Balarama Varma. In the early 1950s, through P. T. Rajan efforts, the present panchaloha idol of Lord Iyappan was installed at Sabarimalai and a procession was taken all over Madras state.

The temple consists of a sanctum sanctorum with a gold-plated roof and four golden finials at the top, two mandapams, the balikalpura which houses the altar. In 1969, the flag staff (dhwajam) was installed.

The shrine of Kannimoola ganapathi prathishta is south-west to The Sreekovil of the Sannidhanam. Devotees offer part of the broken coconut (Neythenga) to the fireplace (Azhi). Ganapathi homam is the main offering.

The Pathinettu thripadikal or the 18 sacred steps is the main stairway to the temple. As per the custom followed, no pilgrim without "Irumudikkettu" can ascend the 18 sacred steps. In 1985, the 18 steps were covered by Panchaloha. The northern gate is open for those who do not carry an "Irumudikkettu", as observed in the Kerala High Court judgment of 1991.

The temples of Lord Ayyappan's trusted lieutenants Karuppu Sami and Kadutha Sami are positioned as his guards (kaval) at the foot of the holy 18 sacred steps.

The temple of Maalikapurathamma, whose importance is almost in par with Lord Ayyappa, is located few yards from Sannidhanam. It is believed that the Lord Ayyapan had specific instructions that he wanted Malikappurath Amma, on his left side. Prior to the fire disaster, there was only a Peeda Prathishta (holy seat) at Malikappuram. The idol of Malikappurath Amma was installed by Brahmasree Kandararu Maheswararu Thanthri. The Devi at Malikappuram holds a Sankh, Chakram and Varada Abhya Mudra. Now the idol is covered with a gold Golaka. The temple also was reconstructed in the last decade and now the conical roof and sopanam is covered with gold.

It is believed that Maalikapurathamma worshipped is the daughter of Cheerappanchira panicker who taught Kalaripayattu to Lord Ayyappa.Cheerappanchira, which is situated about 100 km from Sabarimala holds many rights in Sabarimala, such as to conduct fireworks at Sabarimala, to light Nilavilak and ceremonial lamps at the shrine of Malikapurathamma at Sabarimala, collect half the coconuts given by devotees at Malikapurathamma shrine at Sabarimala.There is also a Mukkalvetti Ayyappa temple at Cheerappanchira which hold 3/4 power of Lord Ayyappa and rest in Sabarimala.

The shrine of the Lord of snakes, Nagarajav is placed adjacent to the malikappuram temple. Pilgrims after the Darsan of Ayyappa and Kannimoola Ganapathi, make their darsan and give offerings to Nagarajav.

Manimandapam, is the place where Ayyappan Jeeva samadhi [Arya kerala jeevasamadhi].

The Sabarimala temple complex include Pampa Ganapathi temple, Nilakal Mahadeva temple and Palliyara Bhagavathi temple. The Nilakal Mahadeva temple and Palliyara Bhagavathi temple is as old as the Shasta temple and the deities are worshiped as the parents of Lord Ayyappa. Ganapathi temple at Pampa has Pampa Maha Ganapathi and Athi Ganapathi (lit. old ganapathy) idols, in Sreekovil where the idol from the first Ganapathy temple is worshiped. Sabari Peedam has a temple of Rama and Hanuman also.

Worship

Mandala kaalam
The pilgrimage to Sabarimala starts from the first day of Vrischika month of Malayalam year (month of Scorpio) and ends on the 11th day of Dhanu month (the Month of Sagittarius). This season of 41-days pilgrimage is known as Mandala kalam (season) . The season is in the months of December and January.

Prasadam

The prasadam at Sabarimala temple is Aravana payasam and Appam. These are prepared by using rice, ghee, sugar, jaggery etc. The rice needed to prepare the prasadam at Sabarimala temple is supplied by Chettikulangara Devi Temple, the second largest temple under the Travancore Devaswom Board situated at Mavelikkara. The Chief Commissioner, Travancore Devaswom Board said that the board has appointed Central Food Technological Research Institute, Mysore as a consultant for providing technical guidance to ensure the quality of Aravana, Appam and other prasadam preparations at Sabarimala temple.

Harivarasanam
Harivarasanam is recited before closing the temple door every night. The Harivarasanam prayer, which is sung at Sabarimala is a Urakkupattu. It is composed by Kambangudi Kulathur Srinivasa Iyer in Sanskrit. It is said that Srinivasa Iyer used to recite the composition after the Athazha Puja, standing in front of the shrine of Ayyappa in the main temple. With the efforts of Swami Vimochanananda, it came to be accepted as the lullaby by the Tantri and Melshanthi. The composition has 352 letters, 108 words in 32 lines in 8 stanzas.

Though there have been many versions of this song sung by many renowned vocalists, the temple plays the rendition by K. J. Yesudas, composed by the renowned music director G. Devarajan, which is in the Madhyamavathi raga of Indian Carnatic music.

Neyyabhishekam
This significant ritual involves pouring sacred ghee brought by pilgrims in their Pallikettu or Irumudi (a two compartment bag made of handwoven cotton cloth used to carry the offerings for Sabarimala Temple carried on their heads) on the idol of Lord Ayyappa. It symbolically means the merging of Jeevatma with the Paramatma. While a red-colored irumudi is used by a pilgrim on his first journey as a Kanni Ayyappan to Sabarimala, others use navy blue till third year and thereafter saffron colored irumudi.

Makara Vilakku

Lord Rama and his brother Lakshmana met Sabari, a tribal devotee, at Sabarimala. Sabari offered the Lord fruits after tasting them. But the Lord accepted them gladly and whole-heartedly. The Lord then saw a divine person doing tapasya. He asked Sabari who it was. Sabari said it was Shasta. Rama walked towards him. Shasta stood up and welcomed the Prince of Ayodhya. The anniversary of this incident is celebrated on Makara Vilakku day. It is believed that on Makara Vilakku day, Lord Dharmashasta stops his tapasya to bless his devotees. The day is also called Makara Shankranthi.

Makarajyothi
This is the star that appear at the moment of Makarasankranthi before the holy arathi and the worship of Makaravilakk at Ponnambalamedu. It is the custom that after seeing Makarajyothi,the lighting of Makaravilakk shall begin.

Tattvamasi
The most important message written at the temple facade is one of the four Mahāvākyas of Advaita or the non-dualistic school of philosophy. Tat Tvam Asi, the 3rd of four Mahavakyas which in sanskrit translates to "Thou Art That" is the principal philosophy that governs the temple and pilgrimage. As the pilgrimage is symbolic for the journey to self-realization that all living beings possess the essence of Brahman, pilgrims refer to each other as Swami, acknowledging their divinity.

The oneness of jIva and Ishvara is described by enquiry into the inner meaning of the statement ‘tat tvam asi’as follows:

 "Tat" refers to Ishvara, the Lord - the word Ishvara has a literal and an implied meaning;
 The literal meaning of ‘Ishvara’ is ‘satyam-brahman together with mithyA-mAyA’;
 The implied meaning of Ishvara is pure Brahman devoid of the superimposition of mAyA;
 "Tvam" refers to the jIva, the individual;
 The literal meaning of ‘jIva’ is ‘AtmA identified with mithyA gross and subtle bodies’;
 The implied meaning is pure consciousness-AtmA without mithyA gross and subtle bodies;
 In advaita AtmA and Brahman are different names of the one Reality;
 Thus, jIva and Ishvara are Absolutely non-different in reality, and only relatively different because of the superimposed names and forms through which the one Reality is experienced.

The history behind the worshipping methods
The customs of the pilgrims to Sabarimala are based on five worshipping methods; those of Shaivites, Shaktists and Vaishnavites. At first, there were three sections of devotees – the devotees of Shakti worship their deity by way of yajna, literally sacrifice., the devotees of Vishnu who followed the strict penance and continence, and the devotees of Shiva who partly followed these two methods. Another name of Ayyappa is Shasta. All these can be seen merged into the beliefs of pilgrims to Sabarimala. The chain the pilgrims wear comes from the Rudraksha chain of the Shaivites. The strict fasting, penance and continence is taken out of the beliefs of the Vaishnavites. The offering of tobacco to Kaduthaswamy can be considered to be taken from the Shaktists.

Pilgrimage 

The devotees are expected to follow a Vratham (41-day austerity period) prior to the pilgrimage. This begins with wearing of a special Mala (a chain made of Rudraksha or Tulasi beads is commonly used, though still other types of chains are available.). During the 41 days of Vratham, the devotee who has taken the vow, is required to strictly follow the rules that include follow only a lacto-vegetarian diet (In India, vegetarianism is synonymous with lacto-vegetarianism), follow celibacy, follow teetotalism, not use any profanity and have to control the anger, allow the hair and nails to grow without cutting. They must try their maximum to help others, and see everything around them as lord Ayyappa. They are expected to bath twice in a day and visit the local temples regularly and only wear plain black or blue coloured traditional clothing.

Many Hindu pilgrims also visit a mosque in Erumely dedicated to Vavar, a Muslim saint who according to tradition was devotee of Lord Ayyappan.

Millions of devotees still follow the traditional mountainous forest path (approximately 61 km) from Erumely, 12.8 km from Vandiperiyar and 8 km from Chalakayam, believed to be taken by Ayyappa himself. The Erumely route starts from Erumely to Aludha river, then crosses the Aludha mountain to reach Karivilam thodu. Now comes the sacred Karimala crossing, from there to Cheriyanavattom, Valliyanavattom and finally Pamba River. Then they have to climb Neelimala and enter into the Ganesha-Bettam, Shreerama-Betta Padam. Then comes the Aranmula kottaram, which is one of the stops of holy journey Thiruvabharana Ghoshayatra (the grand procession of the divine jewelry).

These days people use vehicles to reach the Pamba River by an alternate route. From Pamba, all the pilgrims begin trekking the steep mountain path of Neeli Mala till Sabari Mala. This route is now highly developed, with emergency shops and medical aid by the sides, and supporting aid is provided to the pilgrims while climbing the steep slope, which used to be a mere trail through dense jungle. The elderly pilgrims are lifted by men on bamboo chairs till the top, on being paid.

Women 

Temple management puts religious restriction against entry of women of age 10 to 50. This is based on tradition of the temple to respect the celibate nature of the deity, similar restrictions are present against entry of men in other Hindu temples such as the Pushkar Brahma Temple, and the Kamakhya Temple in Visakhapatnam.

According to the Memoir of the Survey of the Travancore and Cochin States, published in two volumes by the Madras government in the 19th century, women of menstruating age were denied entry into the Sabarimala temple two centuries ago. Though the authors, lieutenants of the Madras Infantry, completed the survey by the end of the year 1820 after nearly five years of research, it was published in two volumes only in 1893 and 1901. "Old women and young girls may approach the temple, but those who have attained the age of puberty and to a certain time of life are forbidden to approach as all sexual intercourse in that vicinity is averse to this deity (Lord Ayyappa)," the report said.
Up to 1991, women visited the temple even though in small numbers. Women pilgrims below the age of 50 would visit the temple to conduct the first rice-feeding ceremony of their children (Chorroonu) in the temple premises.

In 1991, Justices K. Paripoornan and K. Balanarayana Marar of the Kerala High Court, in their ruling against the Travancore Devaswom Board, restricted the entry of women between ages 10 and 50 from offering worship at the temple, stating that such a restriction was in accordance with the usage prevalent from time immemorial. In addition, the judges directed the Government of Kerala, to use the police force to ensure that restriction was complied with. High court also stated that "since there is no restriction between one section and another section or between one class and another class among the Hindus in the matter of entry to a temple (Sabarimala) whereas the prohibition is only in respect of women of a particular age group and not women as a class."

On 28 September 2018, the Supreme Court of India, in a 4-1 majority decision (4 men and 1 women judicial panel), overturned the ban on the entry of women. The Chief Justice, Dipak Misra, stated that the selective ban on women was not an "essential part" of Hinduism, and instead a form of "religious patriarchy". Justice Dhananjaya Y. Chandrachud stated that the ban "stigamatises" and "stereotypes" women, while "placing the burden of men's celibacy" on them. The lone women judge, Indu Malhotra noted in her dissenting judgement that "what constitutes an essential religious practice is for the religious community to decide" and not a matter that should be decided by the courts. She added that "notions of rationality cannot be invoked in matters of religion by courts".

This led to protests at Nilakkal and Pamba base camps on 17 October 2018, when the temple was opened for the first time after the Supreme Court verdict. Protesters assaulted women journalists, stole their camera equipment, and damaged a vehicle. The police were also attacked. A number of women were among the protesters, checking cars to see if they contained women of menstruating age and helping with the road blocks. There were also reports of police damaging protesters' motor bikes. However Lord Ayyappa devotees in a large scale all over Kerala and also in other southern state of India namely Tamil Nadu, Andra pradesh and Karnataka, protested against entry of women in 10-50 age group in Sabarimala. large number of people participated in the protest mainly women devotees. On 26 December 2018 Devotees conducted 'Ayyappa Jyothi' lighting diya or lamp all across the state of Kerala, Karnataka covering a distance of about 765 km from 6 pm to 6-30 pm against young women's entry to temple. Thousands joined in the event. The protestors were physically attacked in Kannur and the state government filed cases against 1400 unidentified participants.

Even other religious groups supported the cause of devotees. Prominent Jain Acharya Yugbhushan Suri Maharaj, also known as Pandit Maharaj, has said that sanctity was a religious issue and that it was connected to fundamental religious rights. Commenting on the Sabarimala temple row, Pandit Maharaj told IndiaToday.in, "Whether it is Sabarimala or Jharkhand's Shikharji, the agitations are for sanctity," adding, "Religion talks about inner belief and sanctity. This should be respected. I am not against the judiciary or the Supreme Court, but they should not overlook the belief of the people." Also, Art of Living founder Ravi Shankar batted for the rules that have been traditionally followed at the sanctum sanctorum of the Ayyappa Temple in Sabarimala.

Two women of menstruating age attempted to enter the temple on 19 October 2018 but were blocked by protesters about 100 m away. After the Thantri threatened to close the sanctum sanctorum if the women attempted to ascend the 18 sacred steps, they turned back.

On 2 January 2019 at 3:45 AM, for the first time after the Supreme Court verdict, two women in their early 40s were escorted by police into the Sabarimala temple, allegedly through a back gate meant for staff. The Chief Minister of Kerala, Pinarayi Vijayan, confirmed their entry. Thereafter, priests closed the temple for one hour to ritually purify it as the 41-days pilgrimage is known as Mandala kalam or the 41-day austerity period/Vratham had not been given a by-pass and the women entered the temple premises violating all those traditions too.

Administration

Administration and legal binding is managed by Travancore Devasvom Board, an affiliate authority of Government of Kerala. Thazhamon Madom is the traditional priest family who has powers over the religious matters to be decided in Sabarimala Temple. Tantri is the highest priest and is the head of the temple. It's the duty of the family to decide on religious matters relating to Sabarimala shrine. Tantris are to be present in all ceremonial Poojas and functions to be held at temple premises and functions associated with temple. The installation of idols of the temple was also done by Tantri of this family.

Currently, Kandararu Rajeevararu and Kandararu Mahesh Mohanaru from Thazhamon Madom are the thantris of Sabarimala, taking yearly turns and A K Sudheer Namboodiri is the elected melshanti of Sabarimala, from November 2019 to November 2020.

Travancore Devaswom Board (TDB) has decided to allow more devotees daily to visit the Sabarimala Ayyappa temple as of 1 December 2020. The number of devotees has been increased from the present 1,000 to 2,000 on week days and from 2,000 to 3,000 on weekends and holidays.

All necessary precautionary measures have been taken at the shrine premises and base camps adhering to COVID-19 guidelines.

Environmental efforts

The waste disposed by the devotees to Sabarimala is threatening the wildlife of the region and the evergreen forests. Efforts are on to make Sabarimala free from pollution and waste. High Court of Kerala has directed that 'Irumudikkettu' should not contain plastic materials. Projects like "Punyam Poonkavanam" has been initiated under the aegis of governmental departments. Mata Amritanandamayi Math has been regularly contributing to keep Sabarimala and its precincts clean. While cleaning Pamba river Sabarimala Sanndidhaanam clean is their primary objective, the broader vision is to spread the message of greenness and cleanliness beyond Sabarimala.

Some of the salient aspects of "Punyam Poonkavanam" project includes:
 Not using soap and oil while bathing in the holy Pamba River. No throwing any material, including clothes in the holy river.
 To prepare irumudikkettu without using any plastic and using only bio-degradable materials.
 To devote at least one hour in cleanliness activities at Sabarimala Sannidhaanam, River Pamba and surroundings as part of the pilgrimage.

Transport

The nearest airports are Thiruvananthapuram International Airport and Cochin International Airport.
Ranni (58 kilometers (36 mi))(
()

Kerala State Road Transport Corporation operates regular daily bus services from Pandalam, Pathanamthitta, Thiruvalla, Kottayam,Thiruvananthapuram, Ernakulam and Kumili. Direct Bus services to Pampa are operated from Pathanamthitta KSRTC,Thiruvalla KSRTC,Kottayam railway station and Chengannur railway station.Buses Are Scheduled From Pathanamthitta KSRTC To Pampa.

See also 
 Pettathullal
 Entry of women to Sabarimala
 Ready To Wait campaign
 Sabarimala Trek
 Vavar

References

External links

 Official Website Of Sabarimala 

 
Hindu temples in Pathanamthitta district
Hindu pilgrimage sites in India
Hindu holy cities
Pamba River
Vegetarian towns in India